Goran Milanko (born 30 October 1968) is a Croatian former professional footballer who played as a midfielder.

Career
Born in Split, Milanko played for Hajduk Split, Brest, Cádiz, Famalicão, PAOK, Chemnitzer FC, Rot-Weiss Essen, Hapoel Haifa and Bnei Sakhnin.

References

External links
 

1968 births
Living people
Footballers from Split, Croatia
Association football midfielders
Yugoslav footballers
Croatian footballers
HNK Hajduk Split players
Stade Brestois 29 players
Cádiz CF players
F.C. Famalicão players
PAOK FC players
Chemnitzer FC players
Rot-Weiss Essen players
Hapoel Haifa F.C. players
Bnei Sakhnin F.C. players
Yugoslav First League players
La Liga players
Primeira Liga players
Super League Greece players
2. Bundesliga players
Israeli Premier League players
Yugoslav expatriate footballers
Yugoslav expatriate sportspeople in France
Expatriate footballers in France
Croatian expatriate footballers
Croatian expatriate sportspeople in Spain
Expatriate footballers in Spain
Croatian expatriate sportspeople in Portugal
Expatriate footballers in Portugal
Croatian expatriate sportspeople in Greece
Expatriate footballers in Greece
Croatian expatriate sportspeople in Germany
Expatriate footballers in Germany
Croatian expatriate sportspeople in Israel
Expatriate footballers in Israel